Jean Hanff Korelitz (born May 16, 1961) is an American novelist, playwright, theater producer and essayist.

Biography 

Korelitz was born to Jewish parents and raised in New York City. After graduating from Dartmouth College with a major in English, she continued her studies at Clare College, Cambridge, where she was awarded the Chancellor's Gold Medal. She has published eight novels since 1996, the most recent being The Latecomer, published in May 2022. She has also written articles and essays for many publications, including Real Simple and the "Modern Love" column in The New York Times.

In 2013 Korelitz created BOOKTHEWRITER, a New York City based service that presents "Pop-Up Book Groups" with prominent authors in private homes. Approximately 20 events are held each year and groups are limited to 20. Past authors have included Joyce Carol Oates, Erica Jong, David Duchovny, Jeanine Cummins, Christina Baker Kline, Jane Green, Adriana Trigiani, Meghan Daum, Dani Shapiro, Darin Strauss, Elizabeth Strout and many others.

In 2015 Korelitz and her sister, Nina Korelitz Matza, created Dot Dot Productions, LLC, in order to produce The Dead, 1904, an immersive theater adaptation of James Joyce's short story "The Dead", with The Irish Repertory Theatre. The story was adapted by Korelitz and Paul Muldoon.

Personal life
While living in England, Korelitz met Irish poet Paul Muldoon.  The couple married on August 30, 1987,  and went on to have two children: Dorothy (born 1992) and Asher (born 1999). From 1990 until 2013 on they lived in Princeton, New Jersey, where Muldoon has long taught Creative Writing. They now reside in Korelitz's native New York City.

Novels

A Jury of Her Peers and The Sabbathday River
Korelitz's first novel, A Jury of Her Peers, was a legal thriller about a Legal Aid lawyer who uncovers a jury tampering plot, which Kirkus called "a monstrous-conspiracy wolf in legal-intrigue clothing." Her second novel, The Sabbathday River, transplanted elements of the plot of Nathaniel Hawthorne's The Scarlet Letter to a small community near Hanover, New Hampshire, and described a case of infanticide and a resulting trial.

The White Rose
Korelitz's third novel, The White Rose, transposed the plot and characters of the Richard Strauss opera Der Rosenkavalier to 1990s New York City. In The New York Times Book Review, reviewer Elizabeth Judd described The White Rose as "incisive and urbane ... (hearkening) back to the gender confusions of Shakespeare's comedies" and called the novel "a significant step forward" following Korelitz's earlier legal thrillers. Anthony Giardina, reviewing the novel in the San Francisco Chronicle, complained that the character of Oliver was occasionally unconvincing but called the academic details of Sophie's and Marian's lives "spot-on". The Boston Globes reviewer, Barbara Fisher, wrote: "Within the comic plot of this lighthearted novel lies a weightier theme. Having played around with disguises, cross-dressing, and self-delusion, the characters happily gain the prize of self-knowledge."

Admission
Admission, published in April 2009, was reviewed in the Education supplement of The New York Times by a high school senior who compared the college application process to the heroine's mid-life crisis. Entertainment Weekly gave the novel an A− rating and called it "that rare thing in a novel: both juicy and literary, a genuinely smart read with a human, beating heart." In its review, Huffington Post reviewer Malcolm Ritter singled out the "atmosphere and details" of the admissions office setting. "That's fascinating for us who've gotten good or bad news from colleges for which we yearned, or shepherded ambitious children through the gauntlet of the application process." The Wall Street Journal criticized the novel for its "wooden monologues" and "improbable love story".

Admission was adapted by screenwriter Karen Croner for the 2013 film of the same name, starring Tina Fey.

You Should Have Known
Grand Central Publishing published Korelitz's fifth novel, You Should Have Known, in March 2014. The book tells the story of a New York therapist who discovers that her beloved husband has a secret and unfathomable life and may have been responsible for a murder. The book was published in eighteen languages. An HBO adaptation of the book, titled The Undoing, aired in 2020 starring Nicole Kidman, Hugh Grant, Donald Sutherland, Matilda De Angelis, Lily Rabe, Edgar Ramirez, Noah Jupe and Noma Dumezweni and directed by Susanne Bier.

The Devil and Webster
Grand Central Publishing published Korelitz's sixth novel, The Devil and Webster, in March 2017. Formerly a VISTA volunteer in Goddard, NH, Naomi Roth is now a feminist scholar and the first female president of Webster College in Central Massachusetts. Webster College, which shares some characteristics with Wesleyan University and others with Dartmouth College, is a liberal arts college known for left-leaning and activist undergraduates. In a plot that mirrors the student unrest of recent years, the Webster community erupts in student protests over the denial of tenure to an African-American professor of anthropology. Roth, whose daughter Hannah is a Webster sophomore, discovers that her own activist past has not prepared her to handle the protest, which quickly spirals out of control. On NPR's Fresh Air, Maureen Corrigan described it as "a smart, semi-satire about the reign of identity politics on college campuses today."

The Plot 
Celadon Books, a division of Macmillan, published Korelitz's seventh novel, The Plot, in spring 2021. The novel concerns a failed writer, Jacob Finch Bonner, who appropriates the plot of his late student's unwritten novel. The resulting book becomes a publishing phenomenon, but its author begins to receive messages from someone who claims to know what he did. In late 2021, it was announced actor Mahershala Ali was signed on to star in a limited series adaptation of The Plot.

The Latecomer 
Korelitz's eighth novel, The Latecomer, was published by Celadon Books on May 31, 2022. Described as a slow-building literary novel, The Latecomer revolves around the wealthy New York-based Oppenheimer family, where the Oppenheimer triplets' lives are upended by the arrival of a fourth, unexpected sibling. In February 2022, it was reported that the novel would be adapting into a television series from Bruna Papandrea's Made Up Stories and Kristen Campo.

Bibliography

Novels 
A Jury of Her Peers (1996)
The Sabbathday River (1999)
The White Rose (2006)
Admission (2009)
You Should Have Known (2014)
The Devil and Webster (2017)
The Plot (2021)
The Latecomer (2022)

 Other books Interference Powder (2003), a middle grade readerThe Properties of Breath (1989), a collection of poetryThe Dead, 1904 (with Paul Muldoon) (2016), an immersive theater adaptation of James Joyce's "The Dead"

 Theater work 
In 2015 Korelitz and her sister, Nina Korelitz Matza, created Dot Dot Productions LLC to produce The Dead, 1904. The Dead, 1904 was produced for The Irish Repertory Theatre in The American Irish Historical Society from November 2016 through January 2017, starring Kate Burton as Gretta Conroy and Boyd Gaines as Gabriel Conroy   and received generally favorable reviews. A second production, from November 2017 through January 2018 starred Melissa Gilbert as Gretta Conroy and Rufus Collins as Gabriel Conroy.Playbill A third production from November 2018 through January 2019 featured most of the remaining cast, including Melissa Gilbert as Gretta Conroy and Rufus Collins as Gabriel Conroy, with the addition of American tenor Robert Mack as Bartell D'Arcy. 
Gallery Press published The Dead, 1904 in November, 2018.

 Film and television adaptations 
Korelitz's book Admission is the basis for the 2013 film of the same name. The film was adapted from the novel by Karen Croner and directed by Paul Weitz. It stars Tina Fey and Paul Rudd, as well as Lily Tomlin, Wallace Shawn, Nat Wolff, and Gloria Reuben. The first trailer was released on November 15, 2012, and the film was released in the US on March 22, 2013. David E. Kelley's adaptation of You Should Have Known, renamed The Undoing'', was filmed for HBO with director Susanne Bier and starring Nicole Kidman, Hugh Grant, Donald Sutherland and Noah Jupe. Originally scheduled for May 2020 it was rescheduled for October 2020.

References

External links 

Author's website

The Undoing (2020) at IMDb

The Dead, 1904
Bookthewriter

20th-century American novelists
1961 births
Living people
21st-century American novelists
American women novelists
20th-century American women writers
21st-century American women writers
20th-century American essayists
21st-century American essayists
American women essayists